

Incumbents 

 Monarch: Elizabeth II
 Governor-General: Rodney Williams
 Prime Minister: Gaston Browne

Events 
Ongoing — COVID-19 pandemic in Antigua and Barbuda

 April 21 – The Sri Lankan government expels an Antigua-registered cargo ship docked at the Magampura Mahinda Rajapaksa Port after authorities discovered undeclared uranium hexafluoride bound for China. The government pledges to take legal action against the ship's owner.
 November 3 – A lawyer representing the governments of Antigua and Barbuda and Tuvalu says that a new commission is being formed to sue big polluters and claim damage reparations for climate change effects on those nations before the International Tribunal for the Law of the Sea.

Death 

 August 9 – Sir Lester Bird, 83, politician.

References 

 
2020s in Antigua and Barbuda
Years of the 21st century in Antigua and Barbuda
Antigua and Barbuda
Antigua and Barbuda